Meadowdale High School is a high school in the Edmonds School District, located in Lynnwood, Washington, United States. The school has students in grades 9 through 12.  Meadowdale competes 3A in the Washington Interscholastic Athletic Association after two years as 4A between 2004-2006.  The school's mascot is the Maverick, though prior to 2000 it was the "Chiefs". 1997-1998 were the years of the school's last major renovations.

The school's schedule is based on a 100-minute, 3-period block schedule, consisting of 1st, 3rd, and 5th periods on Monday and Wednesday and 2nd, 4th, and 6th periods on Tuesday and Thursday.  On Friday, students go to all six classes for roughly 50 minutes each.

Clubs and activities

Some of Meadowdale's clubs and activities include:

ASB
Meadowdale enjoys an active Associated Student Body (ASB), which organizes and carries out events, including community outreach projects. Of particular note is the canned food drive, which attempts to gather 100,000 cans of food. The ASB is organized with a group of six executive officers who run events and activities, and five Senators from each grade level, who are responsible for class events such as dances and the Senior Prom.  The ASB also works closely with the Interhigh association to sponsor district-wide events, such as a District Talent Show.

Music
Meadowdale offers band, orchestra, choir, and guitar electives. Meadowdale is especially renowned for its strong jazz program, which consists of two jazz bands, a 5-person jazz combo, and their vocal jazz ensemble, Impressions, which performs with the combo.

Drama
Meadowdale has a highly active drama club. Shows previously performed by the Meadowdale Players include 13 Past Midnight, Little Women, The Wedding Singer, Romeo and Juliet, Any Number Can Die, Once Upon a Mattress, 12 Angry Jurors, and Thoroughly Modern Millie. The Drama Club as well produces a show called the Miscast Cabret, which promotes Gender Equality by having guys sing songs traditionally sang by girls, and vice versa. They also have an annual festival of ten-minute plays every spring, which are written, directed, and performed by students.

SDoKBC
The Meadowdale student body is well known for its many connections to Kevin Bacon. The students have been inspired by the game Six Degrees of Kevin Bacon, and it has become a popular past time of the students to find more connections to the actor. The smallest separation known as of March 30, 2017 is two degrees.

Athletics
Meadowdale supports a variety of sports teams, playing in the Wesco South 3A league.

Football
Meadowdale finished the 2007 season with a 7-5 record, making it to the state quarterfinals for the first time since 1959 before losing to O'Dea High School.

In 2008 the mavericks went 6-4 (3-1 division) in regular season as well as capturing the 3A Wesco Division Title (under the newly created Wesco 3A division) as well as making another run to the Washington State Playoffs. They lost in their second playoff game to Capital High School

In 2009 the Mavericks finished the regular season undefeated at 11-0.  The Mavericks beat Renton and Columbia River advancing to the state quarterfinals again. The Mavericks lost to Union High School 49-7.

In 2016, the Mavericks reached the state semifinals for the first time in school history, where they fell to O'Dea by a score of 35-9 at Pop Keeney Field in Bothell, WA.

Soccer

In 2004, the boys' soccer team won the 3A state title, beating Mt. Rainier 2-3 in extra time. The girls' soccer team made it to the 3A state competition in 2007 for the first time in six years but lost to Kennedy of Burien 0-0 in the first-round game.  Meadowdale's 2012 girls' soccer team is currently #1 in Washington State with a record of 10-0-0 as of October 11, 2012.

1981 Meadowdale High School Girls Soccer
The 1981 Meadowdale High girls soccer team was the first Snohomish County Class school to win a Washington state high school soccer championship, in fact, this championship match was the first ever Washington state soccer championship playoff for girls. This team placed third in its Class 4A Wesco league and was not expected to win the state title. But they did by beating the Hazen Highlanders 3-2 in a shootout in weather that was very rainy and windy. Roger Bray, an elementary school teacher, was the head coach and two of his daughters, Gayle and Leslie, were members of the team.

Basketball
Meadowdale enjoys successful boys' and girls' basketball programs. During the late 1990s and through the entire 2000's, both programs were a dominating presence in WESCO and a staple at the state tournament. 
The girls have two 3A state titles to their credit, winning in 2000 and 2004, as well as being runners up in 1994 and 1999. All four state championship appearances came under head coach Karen Blair, who was inducted into the Snohomish County Sports Hall of Fame in 2013.Snohomish_County_Sports_Hall_of_Fame_Award_Winners_2015
Before never making the state tournament in program history, the Lady Chiefs/Mavs made the state tournament 16 times in a 17-year span (from 92-93 until 08-09), and placed at state (top 8) 13 times. They have not returned to state since 2009.

The boys' basketball team went to state for the first time in 1978, and did not return again until the 2002-03 season. From 2002-2011 the Mavs made 5 state tournament appearances, including 3 trips to the semifinals. Despite a first round loss to #1 ranked Enumclaw in 2010, Meadowdale placed 5th at state, the highest in program history, and have not returned to the tournament since.

Meadowdale has a feeder program that develops 5th through 8th grade basketball players who will eventually attend the high school. The program describes itself as teaching the "Meadowdale Way" to boys and girls long before they reach high school.

Wrestling
When the Mavericks were known as the Chiefs, they won 3 individual state titles and also had a 6th-place finisher on their way to a team state title in the 83-84 season.  The Chiefs returned a strong team from the year prior and had 2 repeat individual state champions, a 3rd-place finisher, a 4th-place finisher and a 5th-place finisher to capture a back to back team state championship in the 84-85 season. The Chiefs stayed in the lime light with individual state champions in the 86-87 season, and the 89-90 season. The Mavericks won the inaugural Big Dog tournament and had JV wrestlers place in the Panther Classic at Snohomish High School. They also placed 2nd in the Lynnwood Classic in 2009. In 2013 they had a first place state champion and a fourth-place finisher. In 2014 they had a second-place finisher in the matt classic. And in 2015 they had a second and a third-place finisher in the matt classic.

Baseball
The baseball team at MHS has had its fair share of success. In 1980, under coach Ron Martin, the Chiefs defeated Shadle Park HS 8-4 for the school's first baseball state title. 10 years later, they added a second state championship with a 2-0 victory over Hanford. Meadowdale first appeared on the state tournament stage in 1974 and have made 16 trips to date.  Bill Hummel became the head coach in 2005 and in just his 3rd season (2007) as the Mavs' skipper, they advanced to the state semifinals at Safeco Field and took home the 4th-place trophy. The next season (2008) saw an identical result. Since then, MHS has made three additional state appearances with Coach Hummel at the helm, but have not advanced past the 2nd round.

Cheerleading
Currently competing in the 3A Non-Tumbling division, the Meadowdale Cheerleading Squad has taken home State Champion titles at the WIAA Cheerleading State Championships in 2005, 2010, 2013, 2014 and 2016. They have previously competed in Co-ed and Tumbling divisions.

Notable alumni
 Tom McGrath - American voice actor, animator, screenwriter, and film director. He is known for directing all three Madagascar movies as well as Megamind and both Boss Baby movies.   
 Steven W Bailey - American actor from My Big Fat Obnoxious Fiance and as Joe the Bartender on Grey's Anatomy
 Rick Blubaugh - professional soccer player
 Connor Hamlett - NFL player
 Patrick Marleau - NHL Player and all-time leading scorer for the San Jose Sharks
 Kristen O'Neill - WNBA Player
 Layne Staley - lead singer and co-lyricist of Alice in Chains and Mad Season

References

External links
Official website

High schools in Snohomish County, Washington
Lynnwood, Washington
Public high schools in Washington (state)